Lee Abramson (September 13, 1970 – January 20, 2016) was an American composer and musician. He was the first person to write music using ModelTalker, a computerized speech production program.

Musical techniques and career
Abramson used adaptive technology, live musicians and electronic technology to create complex musical expressions, all with one finger. His music featured layers of electronic textures, synthesizers, piano, bass, and percussion. His music was used as a subject for study in a Michigan State University class. Because of his disability, which limited his ability to control a computer to the use of only one finger, Abramson wrote music one note at a time using software such as Sibelius, LogicPro, ModelTalker to use computer recordings of his voice to "sing" on songs, Keystrokes from Assistiveware as an on-screen keyboard.

Abramson produced an educational series of YouTube videos which explains the 5-step method of making music with ModelTalker, with a 6th video showing a real-time bounce of a Logic Pro project with ModelTalker samples "singing".

Tucker Stilley another musician with ALS, shared his custom KeyStrokes keyboard layout for Logic Pro, Abramson's digital audio workstation without which he said, "Would have made what I do impossible".

Prior to his physical illness, Abramson was the bassist for numerous small bands, including Violet Wine and Punchy. His recent creations are classified as Rumi music, where he set Rumi poetry to music. Abramson has performed under several pen name, including Ace NoFace, under which he wrote and produced the album Toxic Charm. In addition, under Rumi Music, he produced a self-titled album, Rumi Music and later, Vow to Silence.

2012 presidential campaign
Abramson ran for President of the United States as an independent candidate in the 2012 election. His candidacy was endorsed by The Daily Swarm. Abramson did not appear on any state ballots in that election.

Education
Abramson attended Okemos High School, The Hebrew University of Jerusalem, and the University of Michigan.
He took Music Marketing, Songwriting, Music Production at Berklee College of Music

Other ventures
Abramson sold pork rinds on the internet from 1998 to 2000.

Death
Abramson was diagnosed with amyotrophic lateral sclerosis in February 2005. He died on January 20, 2016, at the age of 45.

Discography
2009 – Rumi Music
2010 – Vow To Silence
2011 – Spices
2012 – Abramsonium Review
2013 – The Antarctic Wars
2013 – Maize And Bluebeard
2014 - The Bionic Mouth

References

External links
Lee Abramson's website
Model Talker Speech Synthesis Program
Lee Abramson, Disco Dogs

1970 births
2016 deaths
American bass guitarists
American male composers
American composers
Musicians with disabilities
Musicians from Lansing, Michigan
Candidates in the 2012 United States presidential election
21st-century American politicians
University of Michigan alumni
Hebrew University of Jerusalem alumni
Guitarists from Michigan
American male bass guitarists